At the 2011 Pan Arab Games, the table tennis events were held at Aspire Zone in Doha, Qatar from 10–15 December. A total of 6 events were contested.

Medal summary

Men

Women

Medal table

References

External links
Table Tennis at official website

Pan Arab Games
Events at the 2011 Pan Arab Games
2011 Pan Arab Games
2011 Pan Arab Games